Pyjamas Preferred is a 1932 British comedy film directed by Val Valentine and starring Betty Amann, Kenneth Kove and Jay Laurier. It was based on the play The Red Dog by J.O. Twiss. It was shot at Welwyn Studios as a quota quickie.

Premise
In France the husband of a purity league leader runs a shady nightclub.

Cast
 Betty Amann as Violet Ray
 Kenneth Kove as Reverend Samson Sneed
 Jay Laurier as Pierre Gautier
 Jack Morrison as Gustave
 Fred Schwartz as Orsoni
 Amy Veness as Madame Gautier
 Hugh E. Wright as Grock

References

Bibliography
 Chibnall, Steve. Quota Quickies: The Birth of the British 'B' Film. British Film Institute, 2007.
 Low, Rachael. Filmmaking in 1930s Britain. George Allen & Unwin, 1985.
 Wood, Linda. British Films, 1927-1939. British Film Institute, 1986.

External links

1932 films
1932 comedy films
British comedy films
British black-and-white films
1930s English-language films
1930s British films
Films set in Paris
Quota quickies
Films shot at Welwyn Studios